Marie in the City is a Canadian drama film, directed by Marquise Lepage and released in 1987. The film stars Frédérique Collin as Sarah, a prostitute in Montreal who befriends Marie (Geneviève Lenoir), a runaway teenager.

The film garnered four Genie Award nominations at the 9th Genie Awards in 1988: Best Actress (Collin), Best Director (Lepage), Best Art Direction or Production Design (François Séguin) and Best Costume Design (Nicole Pelletier).

References

External links

1987 films
Canadian drama films
1980s French-language films
Films directed by Marquise Lepage
1987 drama films
French-language Canadian films
1980s Canadian films